Mala Sela is a settlement is a small settlement south of Adlešiči in the Municipality of Črnomelj in the White Carniola area of southeastern Slovenia. The area is part of the traditional region of Lower Carniola and is now included in the Southeast Slovenia Statistical Region.

Name
The settlement was created in 1955 by dividing the former settlement of Sela into two parts: Mala Sela and Velika Sela.

References

External links
Mala Sela on Geopedia

Populated places in the Municipality of Črnomelj